James Bloor (born 27 January 1992) is an English writer and actor.

Early career 
Bloor graduated from the University of Cambridge in 2014 with a first-class degree in History and MPhil in the history of political thought.

Career 
In 2015, Bloor made his television debut with ITV's crime drama DCI Banks, where he played Spencer Foster.

Bloor has played one of the lead roles in the horror film Leatherface along with Sam Strike. Julien Maury and Alexandre Bustillo directed the film and it was released in 2017 by Lionsgate.

Bloor starred in the thriller film Go North along with Jacob Lofland, Sophie Kennedy Clark, and Patrick Schwarzenegger. Matthew Ogens directed the film.

Filmography

Film

Television

References

External links 
 

Living people
British male film actors
British male television actors
21st-century British male actors
Alumni of the University of Cambridge
1992 births